Boubacar Sadiki Doumbia (born 8 January 2000) is a Malian professional footballer who plays as defender for Ghanaian Premier League side Bechem United F.C.

Career 
Doumbia joined Ghanaian club Bechem United in October 2020, as the league was set to restart after it was cancelled due to restrictions which arose from the outbreak of the COVID-19 in Ghana. He made his debut during the 2020–21 season. On 17 January 2021, he made his debut after playing the full 90 minutes in a 1–1 draw against Dreams FC.

References

External links 
 

Living people
2000 births
Association football defenders
Malian footballers
Bechem United F.C. players
Malian expatriate footballers
Malian expatriate sportspeople in Ghana
Expatriate footballers in Ghana
Ghana Premier League players
21st-century Malian people